The  women's mass start competition   of the Biathlon World Championships 2011 was held on March 12, 2011 at 12:30 local time.

Results

References

Biathlon World Championships 2011
2011 in Russian women's sport